Bash or BASH may refer to:

Arts and entertainment
 Bash! (Rockapella album), 1992
 Bash! (Dave Bailey album), 1961
 Bash: Latter-Day Plays, a dramatic triptych
 BASH! (role-playing game), a 2005 superhero game
 "Bash" (Glee), an episode from the fifth season of the Glee television show
 WWE The Bash, a professional wrestling event
 Buenos Aires in the Southern Highlands, a social Tango dance event in Australia
 Bash, a character in the video game Skylanders: Spyro's Adventure
 Bash and Dash, two logging engines in the television series Thomas & Friends
 BASH, the tech company led by CEO Peter Isherwell in the 2021 film Don't Look Up

Other uses
 Bash (name), including a list of persons with the name
 Bash (Unix shell), computer software and language
 The Bash (company), an event services booking platform, formerly known as GigMasters
 Party, a social gathering
 Strike (attack), a physical assault
 Bird aircraft strike hazard, an aircraft and bird collision
 British Association for the Study of Headache, a member of the Migraine Trust

See also
 Bash Brothers (disambiguation)
 Bashing (disambiguation)
 Bashful (disambiguation)